Little Hocking is a census-designated place in southern Belpre Township, Washington County, Ohio, United States.  It has a post office with the ZIP code 45742.

Little Hocking lies along the Ohio River a few miles below the county seat of Marietta.  It sits at the intersection of U.S. Route 50 with State Route 124 and County Road 26, where the Little Hocking River meets the Ohio River.

History
Little Hocking was platted in 1875, although a settlement had existed there for years prior. A post office has been in operation at Little Hocking since 1824. The community took its name from the nearby Little Hocking River.

References

Census-designated places in Washington County, Ohio
Ohio populated places on the Ohio River